Benjamin Leon Coleman (born May 18, 1971) is a former American football offensive lineman in the National Football League (NFL).  He played college football at Wake Forest University and was drafted in the second round of the 1993 NFL Draft by the Phoenix/Arizona Cardinals.  He later played for the Jacksonville Jaguars, San Diego Chargers, and the Washington Redskins before retiring in 2001. His son, also named Ben, is an offensive guard for Cal.

Personal life
While a member of the Jaguars, Coleman was the owner of several franchise locations of Cold Stone Creamery in the Jacksonville area.

References

1971 births
Living people
American football offensive guards
Arizona Cardinals players
Jacksonville Jaguars players
Phoenix Cardinals players
San Diego Chargers players
Wake Forest Demon Deacons football players
Washington Redskins players
People from South Hill, Virginia
Players of American football from Virginia
American people convicted of tax crimes